George Kao (29 May 1912 – 1 March 2008) was a Chinese American author, translator, and journalist.   He is best known for translating English-language classics into Chinese and for his efforts to bring Chinese classics to English-speaking audiences.

Biography
Kao was born in Ann Arbor, Michigan in the United States to parents who were studying as Boxer Rebellion Indemnity Scholarship Program students and moved with them to China at age three, living in Nanjing, Beijing, and Shanghai.  He graduated from Yenching University in 1933 and returned to the United States, enrolling in the University of Missouri School of Journalism, where he received a Master's degree in 1935, and Columbia University, where he received a Master's degree in 1937.

From 1937–47, Kao worked for the Publications Section of the Chinese News Service, Inc., a news agency sponsored by the Republic of China's Board of Information and Ministry of Foreign Affairs.  There he edited a daily news bulletin called The Voice of China based on radio reports from Chongqing, the Republic's capital during World War II.  In 1939, Kao was a journalist in New York. He served as a correspondent for China Press and China Weekly Review in Shanghai. In New York, an association named The Foreign Press Association was formed by foreign journalists. Kao was the only Chinese journalist among fifteen members. They wrote a book together called You Americans. In the book, Kao titled his chapter " Your Country and My People" as a play on Lin Yutang's book My Country and My People.

From 1947–49, he worked for China's newly formed Government Information Office as Director of the West Coast office and, later, as Editor-in-Chief of The Chinese Press (華美周報 Huá-Měi Zhōubào).From 1951–53, Kao was a Chinese-language Instructor at the United States Department of Defense's Defense Language Institute in Monterey, California. In 1957, he became Chief Editor for the Washington, D.C. Voice of America's radio Chinese Broadcast, and later Deputy Director of the China Branch, and resided in nearby Kensington, Maryland.  In 1972, he moved to Hong Kong as a Visiting Senior Fellow at the newly founded Research Centre for Translation at the Chinese University of Hong Kong. He returned to Kensington, Maryland in 1976 and lived in Rockville, Maryland and in Florida for the remainder of his life.  His wife of 57 years, Maeching Li Kao (born ca. 1920), died on 25 July 2003 and Kao himself died in 2008 at the Mayflower retirement home in Winter Park, Florida.

Before his death, Kao established the George and Maeching Kao Endowment for Chinese Studies at Rollins College in Winter Park, Florida. The memorial funding, a living testimony to Kao's lifelong dedication to promoting mutual understanding between the American and Chinese peoples, provides funding for scholarship, language learning and library purchases each year.

Writings and translations
Kao was prolific as a translator from both English to Chinese and Chinese to English.  He is known in the Chinese world as the translator of several classics of English-language literature and as the author of several books on the English language and about the United States.  Among his literary translations are F. Scott Fitzgerald's The Great Gatsby, Thomas Wolfe's Look Homeward Angel, and Eugene O'Neill's Long Day's Journey Into Night.  With his brother Irving K.Y. Kao, he was Co-Editor of a popular New Dictionary of Idiomatic American English, published by both the Chinese University Press and Peking University Press in traditional and simplified Chinese editions, respectively.  He also translated numerous Chinese works into English.  At the Chinese University of Hong Kong, he founded (in 1973) and served as Editor of the highly regarded Renditions which translates classical and contemporary Chinese literature into English.  He also contributed a number of translations to the journal himself.  He edited or translated several of Taiwan author Pai Hsien-yung's collections into English.

Selected works
Some works written or edited by George Kao include:
New Dictionary of Idiomatic American English: A Compendium of Popular Words and Phrases (coedited with Irving K.Y. Kao) (1994) 
Cathay by the Bay: San Francisco Chinatown in 1950 (1987) 
The Translation of Things Past: Chinese History and Historiography (1982) 
Two Writers and the Cultural Revolution: Lao She and Chen Jo-hsi (1980) 
紐約客談 (Niǔyuē Kètán) (1964) 
The Collected Wartime Messages of Generalissimo Chiang Kai-shek, 1937–1945 (1946) 
Chinese Wit and Humor (1946)

Selected translations
The Great Gatsby (大亨小傳) F. Scott Fitzgerald. (1971)  
Long Day's Journey Into Night (長夜漫漫路迢迢). Eugene O'Neill. (1973)  
Look Homeward, Angel (天使，望故鄉). Thomas Wolfe. (1985)  
Taipei People (台北人) Pai Hsien-yung (白先勇). (2000)  
四十自述 Autobiography at Forty. 胡适 (Hu Shih). (2016)

References

Additional sources 
Joe Holley. "George Kao; Writer-Translator Helped Readers in China, U.S. Share Cultures." (Obituary). Washington Post. 7 March 2008. p. B07.
"George Kao 高克毅." at National Taiwan University Library website

External links
大亨小傳:增訂版前言 (The Great Gatsby: Introduction to the Expanded Edition by George Kao) at ReadingTimes.com 

Chinese–English translators
English–Chinese translators
American radio journalists
American newspaper reporters and correspondents
American book editors
American magazine writers
American writers of Chinese descent
American emigrants to China
Chinese Civil War refugees
University of Missouri alumni
Columbia University alumni
Defense Language Institute alumni
Defense Language Institute faculty
Republic of China journalists
Writers from Ann Arbor, Michigan
People from Winter Park, Florida
20th-century American translators
21st-century American translators
1912 births
2008 deaths